Diane O'Grady (born 23 November 1967 in North Bay, Ontario) is a Canadian rower.

References 
 
 

1967 births
Living people
Canadian female rowers
Rowers at the 1996 Summer Olympics
Sportspeople from North Bay, Ontario
Olympic bronze medalists for Canada
Olympic rowers of Canada
Olympic medalists in rowing
World Rowing Championships medalists for Canada
Medalists at the 1996 Summer Olympics
Pan American Games gold medalists for Canada
Pan American Games medalists in rowing
Rowers at the 1995 Pan American Games
Medalists at the 1995 Pan American Games
20th-century Canadian women